Hasan Amid (1910–1979) was an Iranian lexicographer, writer, and journalist.

Life and activities
Hasan Amid was born in 1910 in Mashhad, Khorasan province of Iran. He completed his education in Mashhad, and became a member of Anjoman-e Adabi ("the Literary Community"). He started his career in journalism, writing, and lexicography in those years. Among his most important activities in Mashhad was being editor-in-chief of Khorasan yearbook and Tus newspaper.

During the Anglo-Soviet invasion of Iran, when the Soviet forces captured Mashhad, Amid was exiled to Tehran.

Hasan Amid spent decades of his life on research centering on dictionaries and lexicography. He wrote multiple Persian dictionaries in these years, the most notable being Amid dictionary ( Farrhang-e Amid). He died on 10 September 1979.

Works
  Amid dictionary 
 Farhang-e No (1929)
 Farhang-e Koochak-e Amid
 Farhang-e Mofasal-e Amid
 Farhang-e Bargozide-ye Amid
 Farhang-e Jibi-ye Amid
 Farhang-e Dabirestani-ye Amid
 Farhang-e Tarikh va Joghrafia-ye Amid
 Gross Errors in Persian Dictionaries
 Nikookaran (1936)
 Khorasan Yearbook
 On the Ruins of Persepolis (1931)
 Magnetism Mysteries
 Tebb-e Jadid

References
Rasekhoon 
ICAL 

Iranian writers
Iranian journalists
Iranian lexicographers
1910 births
1979 deaths
20th-century journalists
20th-century lexicographers